Erin Thompson may refer to:

 Erin L. Thompson, American art historian and lawyer
 Erin Thompson (politician), Australian politician